Pritha is a genus of crevice weavers that was first described by Pekka T. Lehtinen in 1967.

Species
 it contains nineteen species found in Asia and Europe:
Pritha albimaculata (O. Pickard-Cambridge, 1872) – Israel
Pritha ampulla Wang, 1987 – China
Pritha beijingensis Song, 1986 – China
Pritha condita (O. Pickard-Cambridge, 1873) – Azores, St. Helena
Pritha crosbyi (Spassky, 1938) – Azerbaijan, Kazakhstan, Central Asia
Pritha debilis (Simon, 1911) – Algeria
Pritha dharmakumarsinhjii Patel, 1978 – India
Pritha garfieldi Marusik & Zamani, 2015 – Iran
Pritha hirsuta (O. Pickard-Cambridge, 1872) – Israel
Pritha nana (Simon, 1868) (type) – Mediterranean, India
Pritha napadensis (Patel, 1975) – India
Pritha pallida (Kulczyński, 1897) – Madeira, Portugal, Spain, Italy, Croatia, Greece, Georgia
Pritha parva Legittimo, Simeon, Di Pompeo & Kulczycki, 2017 – France, Italy, Switzerland, Bulgaria
Pritha poonaensis (Tikader, 1963) – India
Pritha sagittata Legittimo, Simeon, Di Pompeo & Kulczycki, 2017 – Italy, Switzerland, Croatia
Pritha spinula Wang, 1987 – China
Pritha tenuispina (Strand, 1914) – Israel
Pritha vestita (Simon, 1873) – France (Corsica), Bulgaria
Pritha zebrata (Thorell, 1895) – Myanmar

References

Araneomorphae genera
Filistatidae
Spiders of Africa
Spiders of Asia
Taxa named by Pekka T. Lehtinen